Budd Grossman (born March 2, 1924) was an American producer and screenwriter. He produced and wrote for television programs including Dennis the Menace, The Doris Day Show, Get Smart, The Andy Griffith Show, Gilligan's Island, Diff'rent Strokes, Three's Company (and its spin-off Three's a Crowd), Maude, Small Wonder, The Paul Lynde Show, That Girl and The Real McCoys.

References

External links 

1924 births
Year of death missing
American television writers
American screenwriters
American television producers
American male screenwriters
American male television writers
20th-century American screenwriters